Jürgen Mössmer (born 11 June 1989) is a German footballer who plays as a defender and defensive midfielder .

References 

1989 births
Living people
German footballers
German people of Brazilian descent
Association football defenders
Eintracht Frankfurt players
3. Liga players
VfR Aalen players
1. FC Nürnberg players
People from Reutlingen
Sportspeople from Tübingen (region)
Footballers from Baden-Württemberg